Homecoming to Happiness is a 1933 German comedy film directed by Carl Boese and starring Luise Ullrich, Paul Hörbiger and Heinz Rühmann. It was shot at the EFA Studios in Berlin's Halensee area. The film's sets were designed by the art director Franz Schroedter. Alessandro Blasetti directed an Italian remake L'impiegata di papà in 1934.

Synopsis
While motoring in the countryside, a wealthy shoe tycoon suffers a case of mistaken identity that leads to an unemployed actor being taken for him. The tycoon meanwhile meets and falls in love with a beautiful young woman.

Cast
 Luise Ullrich as Liesl Pichler
 Paul Hörbiger as Karl Gruber
 Heinz Rühmann as Amadori
 Ludwig Stössel as Pichler
 Erika Falgar as Liane Gruber
 Paul Heidemann as Schloßverwalter
 Harry Gondi as Rudi Schröder
 Hans Hemes as Erster Jäger
 Hans Albin as Zweiter Jäger
 Lis de Boy as Eine Freundin Lianes
 Richard Klick as Pichlers Lehrling
 Ossy Kratz-Corell as Betrunkener Jodler
 Wolfgang Staudte as Phillip, Grubers Sekretär

References

Bibliography 
 
 Klaus, Ulrich J. Deutsche Tonfilme: Jahrgang 1933. Klaus-Archiv, 1988.

External links 
 

1933 films
German comedy films
1933 comedy films
1930s German-language films
Films directed by Carl Boese
Films of the Weimar Republic
Films of Nazi Germany
German black-and-white films
Films scored by Eduard Künneke
1930s German films
Films shot at Halensee Studios